The Tipperary county football team represents Tipperary in men's Gaelic football and is governed by Tipperary GAA, the county board of the Gaelic Athletic Association. The team competes in the three major annual inter-county competitions; the All-Ireland Senior Football Championship, the Munster Senior Football Championship and the National Football League.

Tipperary's home ground is Semple Stadium, Thurles. The team's manager is David Power.

Tipperary was the second Munster county to win an All-Ireland Senior Football Championship (SFC), as well as to appear in the final, following Limerick. The team last won the Munster Senior Championship in 2020, the All-Ireland Senior Championship in 1920 and has never won the National League.

History
Tipperary has won the All-Ireland Senior Football Championship (SFC) on four occasions — in 1889, 1895, 1900 and 1920. Munster Senior Football Championships also followed in 1922 and 1935 but seven provincial final defeats spanning 85 years followed those until winning against Cork in the 2020 Munster Senior Football Championship Final.

As the football championship is contested by a much larger number of teams than in hurling, success is hard won because of the high standard attained by many counties. For details on football history, see here.

Kearns era: 2015–2019
In November 2015, Liam Kearns, from the Kerry GAA club Austin Stacks, was appointed manager, with under-21, minor and junior manager Tommy Toomey as selector and Kearns's other selectors were Paul Fitzgerald of Fethard (Tipperary) and Shane Stapleton of Golden-Kilfeacle (Tipperary).

In the 2016 All-Ireland SFC, the county reached the semi-final for the first time since 1935. Michael Quinlivan scored an early goal against Galway in the quarter-final victory. Conor Sweeney scored two more goals for Tipperary in that game.

But the following three seasons brought only two championship wins, against Waterford and Cavan, the former in 2017 and the latter in 2018. The 2017 Munster Senior Football Championship semi-final was lost to a last-minute goal conceded to opponents Cork.

Tippeary achieved promotion to Division 2 in 2017, sealed late on in the concluding game against Armagh with the completion of by a second-half hat-trick from Michael Quinlivan.

The team was relegated to Division 3 in 2019. Exit from the 2019 Munster Senior Football Championship swiftly followed, the defeat to Limerick that county's first championship victory in seven years. An All-Ireland SFC qualifier defeat to Down in Newry ended Tipperary's season and Kearns's time as manager. It was the first year since 2013 that Tipperary did not win a single championship match.

Power era: 2019–
In September 2019, David Power was named as the new manager of the Tipperary senior team on a two-year term.

On 22 November 2020, Tipperary won the 2020 Munster Senior Football Championship after a 0-17 to 0-14 win against Cork in the final. It was Tipperary's first Munster SFC title in 85 years. This achievement was all the more noteworthy as Tipperary had won only four league games in their previous two campaigns.

On 6 December 2020, Tipperary played a second All-Ireland SFC semi-final in four years and again faced Mayo. In foggy conditions and losing by 16 points at half-time, the team eventually lost the game by a scoreline of 5-20 to 3-13.

Support
Friends of Tipperary Football was established in 1993. It organises fundarsing events and provides support for football in a county where hurling traditionally dominates. It has an officer board and executive committee.

Crest and colours
The Tipperary players wore a white and green commemorative jersey for the 2020 Munster Senior Football Championship final - a replica of the jersey colours worn by the Tipperary team which was attacked on Bloody Sunday of 1920. At that time the county wore the colours of its county champions, not having an official jersey. The then county champions Fethard wore blue and white but Grangemockler's white and green was worn instead.

Current panel

INJ Player has had an injury which has affected recent involvement with the county team.
RET Player has since retired from the county team.
WD Player has since withdrawn from the county team due to a non-injury issue.

Current management team
Manager: David Power
Management team: Charlie McGeever, Michael McGeehin, Paddy Christie, Joe Hayes (former Clare goalkeeper)
Selectors: 
Coach: Martin Horgan
S&C Coach: Paudie Kissane
Physio: Ian Dowling
Forwards coach: Declan Browne, joined in January 2021

Managerial history
This is an incomplete list of Tipperary county football team managers (senior).

Players

Notable players

Notable players include:
Philip Austin: 2006–2020
Tommy Doyle
Michael Hogan
Peter Lambert
Declan Browne
John O'Callaghan
Michael Quinlivan

Records

Most appearances

Top scorers

All Stars
Tipperary has four All Stars.

Team sponsorship
Since 1991 the following companies have sponsored all of the Tipperary county football teams.

1991–1992: Cidona
1993–1995: Hayes Hotel
1995–1997: Moy Insulation
1998–2001: Finches
2002–2011: Enfer Scientific
2011–2014: Škoda
2015–present: Intersport/Elverys

Honours

National
All-Ireland Senior Football Championship
 Winners (4): 1889, 1895, 1900, 1920
 Runners-up (1): 1918
Tommy Murphy Cup
 Winners (1): 2005
 
All-Ireland Junior Football Championship
 Winners (3): 1912, 1923, 1998
All-Ireland Under-21 Football Championship
 Runners-up (1): 2015
All-Ireland Minor Football Championship
 Winners (2): 1934, 2011

Provincial
Munster Senior Football Championship
 Winners (10): 1888, 1889, 1895, 1900, 1902, 1918, 1920, 1922, 1935, 2020
 Runners-up (18): 1894, 1899, 1907, 1923, 1926, 1928, 1930, 1931, 1932, 1933, 1939, 1943, 1944, 1993, 1994, 1998, 2002, 2016
Munster Junior Football Championship
 Winners (7): 1910, 1912, 1923, 1935, 1937, 1952, 1998
Munster Under-21 Football Championship
 Winners (2): 2010, 2015
Munster Minor Football Championship
 Winners (7): 1934, 1935, 1955, 1984, 1995, 2011, 2012
McGrath Cup
 Winners (3): 1989, 1993, 2003
Munster Football League
 Winners (2): 1929–30, 1934–35

References

 
County football teams